Sergei Vasilyevich Makarov (born 3 October 1996) is a Russian footballer. He plays as a right-back for Akron Tolyatti.

Club career
During 2016–2017 he played for Minsk. In the summer of 2017 he moved to the Cypriot club Anorthosis, but only played for their Under-21 team, making no appearances for the senior squad. On 14 January 2018 he signed a 1-year contract with FC SKA-Khabarovsk.

International
He won the 2013 UEFA European Under-17 Championship with the Russia national under-17 football team, with which he also participated in the 2013 FIFA U-17 World Cup. He also participated in the 2015 UEFA European Under-19 Championship, in which Russia national under-19 football team was the runner-up.

Career statistics

References

External links 
 
 
 
 Profile at Lokomotiv Moscow website

1996 births
Sportspeople from Khabarovsk Krai
Living people
Russian footballers
Association football midfielders
Russia youth international footballers
Russia under-21 international footballers
FC Lokomotiv Moscow players
FC Minsk players
FC SKA-Khabarovsk players
Anorthosis Famagusta F.C. players
FC Isloch Minsk Raion players
FC Rotor Volgograd players
FC Akron Tolyatti players
Russian Premier League players
Russian First League players
Belarusian Premier League players
Russian expatriate footballers
Expatriate footballers in Belarus
Russian expatriate sportspeople in Belarus
Expatriate footballers in Cyprus
Russian expatriate sportspeople in Cyprus